Hermann Pfeiffer (1902–1969) was a German stage and film actor. He also directed several films including Counterfeiters (1940).

Selected filmography

Actor

 Truxa (1937)
 When Women Keep Silent (1937)
 The Yellow Flag (1937)
The Chief Witness (1937)
 Talking About Jacqueline (1937)
 The Coral Princess (1937)
 The Irresistible Man (1937)
 Autobus S (1937)
 Nanon (1938)
 The Man Who Couldn't Say No (1938)
 The Muzzle (1938)
 The Stars Shine (1938)
 Red Orchids (1938)
 By a Silken Thread (1938)
 Five Million Look for an Heir (1938)
 Napoleon Is to Blame for Everything (1938)
 Kitty and the World Conference (1939)
 Alarm at Station III (1939)
 The Right to Love (1939)
 Woman Made to Measure (1940)
 Everything for Gloria (1941)
 Diesel (1942)
 Front Theatre (1942)
 Circus Renz (1943)
 Back Then (1943)
 The Golden Spider (1943)
 The Wedding Hotel (1944)
 The Exchange (1952)
 I Can't Marry Them All (1952)
 Diary of a Married Woman (1953)
 The Last Waltz (1953)
 They Call It Love (1953)
 The Little Town Will Go to Sleep (1954)
 Guitars of Love (1954)
 School for Marriage (1954)
 Dear Miss Doctor (1954)

Director
 Counterfeiters (1940)
 Search for Majora (1949)
 Inspector Hornleigh Intervenes (1961, TV series)

References

Bibliography

External links

1902 births
1969 deaths
German male film actors
German male stage actors
Mass media people from Wuppertal
People from Elberfeld